The 2017–18 season was the club's fourth season since its establishment in 2014 and their fourth season in the Indian Super League.

Season overview

Pre Season Friendlies 
The club headed to Spain and Qatar on a 41 days pre-season tour, starting from 10 September.

Transfers 
Unlike other Indian Super League franchises Delhi Dynamos decided not retain any players from their previous season squad before 2017–18 players draft which enabled them to enter in the round one of players draft along with new entrant Jamshedpur FC.

In ISL draft held on 23 July 2017, Delhi Dynamos added fifteen new players to their squad. Goalkeeper Albino Gomes, Sukhdev Patil and Arnab Das Sharma, defender Pritam Kotal, Sena Ralte, Pratik Chowdhary, Mohammad Sajid Dhot, Rowilson Rodrigues and Munmun Lugun, midfielder Seityasen Singh, Vinit Rai, Romeo Fernandes, David Ngaihte and Simranjit Singh and Lallianzuala Chhangte.

Delhi Dynamos announced signing of Brazilian midfielder Paulinho Dias on 28 July 2017. On 1 August, Delhi Dynamos announced signing of Uruguayan midfielder Matías Mirabaje. Signing of Argentinian forward Juan Vogliotti was announced on 4 August. Franchise announced on 10 August, they signed Venezuelan defender Gabriel Cichero. On 29 August, Delhi Dynamos published a statement on their website that signing of Argentinian forward Juan Vogliotti could not be completed due to unavoidable circumstances. Juan Vogliotti said:

Delhi Dynamos announced on 7 September, they signed Nigerian forward Kalu Uche. On 12 September, Delhi Dynamos announced signing of Curaçaoan forward Guyon Fernandez and Spanish defender Edu Moya. On 14 September, Delhi Dynamos announced signing of their seventh foreign player, Dutch forward Jeroen Lumu.

On 19 September, Delhi Dynamos announced they signed Indian U19 international players Kishan Singh Thongam and Jayananda Singh Moirangthem. On the matter managing director Rohan Sharma said:

On 21 September, Delhi Dynamos announced signing of Nanda Kumar on a loan deal from I-League side Chennai City.

In

Out

Loan in

Squad

Current Technical Staff

Indian Super League

Matches

Player statistics

List of squad players, including number of appearances by competition

|}

References

External links

Odisha FC seasons
Delhi Dynamos